Ken Goodwin (7 April 1933 – 18 February 2012) was an English comedian, singer and musician best known for his performances on the ITV Television show The Comedians.

Early life 
He was born William Kenneth Unwin in Manchester, Lancashire. His father was a stoker. While he was still a child, his mother walked out on the family – an experience he blamed for his insecurity and shyness. His father died from cancer when Unwin was 15.

Career 
Goodwin was a great fan of George Formby. He did various jobs and started performing in working men's clubs, telling jokes and playing the ukulele. He then performed on the Royal Variety Show in 1971 and in a summer season at the London Palladium, before his television break on Opportunity Knocks followed by The Comedians. He also appeared on BBC TVs The Good Old Days.
He was the first regular performer on The Comedians to receive his own solo show on television, as ATV gave him his own TV special in 1972. He was a regular guest on television variety up to 1973, mainly on the ITV channels, with his most memorable slot being on the David Nixon Show in 1973. 
After that, appearances on television dwindled due to his wife's illness. He appeared twice in 1974 and not at all from 1975 onwards.
He failed to re-appear on television after he started performing again in 1977. He remained a regular and much sought-after live act, especially in Blackpool, and the reason for the demise of his television career is unclear, particularly as other members of The Comedians (Mike Reid, Charlie Williams, Bernard Manning, Frank Carson, Jim Bowen) overtook Goodwin to have much longer and more successful careers on TV.

Goodwin was famous for his giggle and catchphrase, "settle down now" which he used a lot on The Comedians. This phrase , ' Settle Down '/ ' Got to have Tenderness ' ,  was also used for his 1972 Single release , on Pye Records, written by Tony Hatch and Jackie Trent, one of a few 1970's releases; others  were: ' Keep your Heart '/ ' I'm Alabamy Bound ' , '72 ; ' So Lucky '/ ' Just Like  a Woman ' , '73 ; ' Memories '/ ' I Love How you Love Me ' , '76.

Marriages 
Ken married his first wife, Pat Earith in 1956. When she fell ill in 1974, Goodwin abandoned his career to care for her until her death in 1977.  They had been married for 21 years. His second marriage was to singer and dancer Vicki Lane until his death in 2012.

Death 
He died on 18 February 2012 of Alzheimer's disease in a home in Rhos-on-Sea, North Wales having lived in nearby Llandudno since his retirement.

References

External links
 
 Goodwin - Another Good Time (YouTube)

English male comedians
English stand-up comedians
Deaths from Alzheimer's disease
Deaths from dementia in Wales
1933 births
2012 deaths
Comedians from Manchester